The 18th TVyNovelas Awards, is an Academy of special awards to the best of soap operas and TV shows. The awards ceremony took place on May 30, 2000 in Mexico D.F. The ceremony was televised in Mexico by El Canal de las Estrellas.

Marco Antonio Regil and Adela Micha hosted the show. Laberintos de pasión won 7 awards including Best Telenovela, the most for the evening. Other winners Mujeres engañadas won 5 awards, Tres mujeres won 3 awards and Amor gitano, Infierno en el paraíso, La vida en el espejo, Serafín and Sueños de juventud won 1 each.

Summary of awards and nominations

Winners and nominees

Telenovelas

Others

Special Awards 
 International Projection Music: Pepe Aguilar
 For her 50-year Career: Angélica María
 For his 25-year Music Career: Emmanuel
 Best Art Design: Mirsa Paz for Amor gitano

References 

TVyNovelas Awards
TVyNovelas Awards
TVyNovelas Awards
TVyNovelas Awards ceremonies